The Steamship That Carried Peace is a documentary film about the Turkish steamship SS Kurtuluş, that sank in 1942 in the Marmara Sea while taking food aid to Greece under Nazi occupation and suffering the Great Famine. The film was based on the research by Turkish writer-researcher-film director Erhan Cerrahoğlu and debuted on June 1, 2006 in Istanbul.

See also
 SS Kurtuluş
 Great Famine (Greece)

References

External links
 
 The Story of "The Steamer That Carried Peace" 
 Barışı taşıyan vapur (The ship that carried peace)

Turkish documentary films
2006 films
Documentary films about maritime disasters
Greece–Turkey relations
2006 documentary films
Documentary films about World War II